2017 Georgian Super Cup was a Georgian football match that was played on 26 February 2017 between the champions of 2016 Umaglesi Liga, Samtredia, and the winner of the 2016 Georgian Cup, Torpedo Kutaisi.

Match details

See also
2016 Umaglesi Liga
2016 Georgian Cup

References

2017
FC Torpedo Kutaisi
FC Samtredia
Supercup
February 2017 sports events in Europe